The 1912–13 Yale Bulldogs men's soccer team was the program's sixth season of existence and their sixth playing in the Intercollegiate Soccer Football League (ISFL).

The season saw Yale go 5-0-0 in all competitive fixtures, earning themselves the ISFL national championship, which predated the NCAA Championship as the national collegiate college soccer championship.

Results

References 

Yale
1912
1912
Yale Bulldogs men's soccer
Yale Bulldogs men's soccer